Henry III, Prince of Anhalt-Aschersleben (died 9 November 1307) was a German prince of the House of Ascania and ruler of the principality of Anhalt-Aschersleben.

He was the youngest son of Henry II, Prince of Anhalt-Aschersleben, by his wife Matilda, daughter of Otto the Child, Duke of Brunswick-Lüneburg.

Life
After the death of his father in 1266, Henry and his older brother Otto inherited the principality of Anhalt-Aschersleben; but because they were still underage, their mother Matilda acted as regent until they were proclaimed adults in 1270.

Destined for the church at a very young age, he became a canon at Magdeburg in 1274 and provost of St. Blasius at Brunswick in 1281.

Henry co-ruled with his brother until 1283, when he renounced all his rights over Aschersleben in Otto's favor.

In 1305 Henry was elected Archbishop of Magdeburg and was formally installed in 1306. He died one year later.

Princes of Anhalt-Aschersleben
Archbishops of Magdeburg
1307 deaths
Year of birth unknown